Mordovia may refer to:
Republic of Mordovia, a federal subject of Russia
Mordovian Okrug (1928–1930), an administrative division of the Russian SFSR, Soviet Union
Mordovian Autonomous Oblast (1930–1934), an administrative division of the Russian SFSR, Soviet Union
Mordovian Autonomous Soviet Socialist Republic (1934–1994), an administrative division of the Russian SFSR, Soviet Union

See also
 Moldova (disambiguation)